Ritz Ballroom may refer to:

 Ritz Ballroom, Bridgeport, Connecticut, USA
 Ritz Ballroom, Kings Heath, Birmingham, England